Bipectilus omaiensis is a species of moth of the family Hepialidae. It is known from Sichuan province, China.

References

External links
Hepialidae genera

Moths described in 1988
Hepialidae